Caleb Brousseau (born July 30, 1988) is a Canadian para-alpine skier.

He was born in Terrace, British Columbia and has 11 brothers and sisters. In 2007 he was injured in a snowboarding accident and transitioned to sit skiing.

He won a bronze medal at the 2014 Winter Paralympics in Sochi, Russia, in the men's sitting super-G.

References

Living people
Paralympic bronze medalists for Canada
Alpine skiers at the 2014 Winter Paralympics
Paralympic alpine skiers of Canada
1988 births
People from Terrace, British Columbia
Sportspeople from British Columbia
Medalists at the 2014 Winter Paralympics
Canadian male alpine skiers
Paralympic medalists in alpine skiing